SS&C Advent (formerly Advent Software) is a business unit of SS&C Technologies.

Advent Software was founded in 1983 by Steve Strand and Stephanie DiMarco. DiMarco served as president and CEO until June 2012, at which point she stepped down and was succeeded by Peter Hess.

On July 8, 2015, Advent Software was acquired by SS&C Technologies and is now known as SS&C Advent.

Corporate identity

Logo design

References

External links 
 

Companies based in San Francisco
Software companies established in 1983
Financial software companies
1983 establishments in California
2015 mergers and acquisitions
Software companies of the United States
Companies established in 1983
1983 establishments in the United States